Raúl Torrente Navarro (born 1 March 2001) is a Spanish professional footballer who plays as a central defender for Granada CF.

Club career
Born in San Javier, Region of Murcia, Torrente represented FC Cartagena and Mar Menor FC as a youth. He made his first team debut with the latter on 8 April 2018, coming on as a late substitute in a 2–1 Tercera División home win over CD Minera.

In 2018, Torrente moved to Granada CF and returned to youth football. He was promoted to the reserves ahead of the 2020–21 campaign, and immediately became a starter for the side. On 1 September 2021, he renewed his contract until 2024.

Torrente made his professional – and La Liga – debut on 1 November 2021, replacing Luis Milla late into a 3–0 away success over Levante UD.

References

External links

2001 births
Living people
People from San Javier, Murcia
Spanish footballers
Footballers from the Region of Murcia
Association football defenders
La Liga players
Segunda División B players
Segunda Federación players
Tercera División players
Granada CF footballers
Club Recreativo Granada players
Spain under-21 international footballers